Amber Nash (born June 6, 1977) is an American actress and improvisational comedian. She is known as the voice actress for Pam Poovey in the animated TV series Archer. She was also featured in the animated TV series Frisky Dingo.

Early life and education
Nash graduated from Georgia State University and worked as a youth counselor before beginning her work as an actor and improvisor.

Filmography

Film

Television

Theatre
Catch 23 Atlanta
The Doug Dank Project
Improv Ensemble
The Second City: Peach Drop, Stop and Roll at the Alliance Theatre

Personal life
Nash is part of the Improv Ensemble at Dad's Garage Theater and The Laughing Matters. She is a co-founder of The Doug Dank Project at Push Push Theatre and part of the Catch 23.

Nash is married to improviser and actor Kevin Gillese with whom she regularly collaborates on comedic projects through Dad's Garage Theatre. She is vegan.

Nash is a member of the board of directors of Project Chimps, a sanctuary for former research chimpanzees funded in large part by the Humane Society of the United States.

References

External links

Living people
American voice actresses
1977 births
21st-century American actresses